Earlene is a given name, the feminine equivalent of the name Earl. Both names derive from Old English term eorl, meaning "nobleman" or "chieftain". The name may also be related to the Irish Gaelic names Arleen and Arlene, which mean "the pledge".

Variant spellings of this name include Earline, Earleen,  Earlena, Erlean, and Erleen. Related names include Earla, Earley, Earlie and Erlinda.

People
 Earlene Brown (1935–1983), athlete
 Earlene Fowler (b. 1954), author
 Earlene Hill Hooper (b. 1938?), politician of New York
 Earlene Risinger (1927–2008), professional baseball pitcher
 Earlene Roberts (1935–2013), politician of New Mexico

See also

References

English given names
English-language feminine given names
Irish feminine given names